El Obeid Airport  is an airport serving El-Obeid, the capital city of the North Kurdufan state in Sudan.

Facilities

Airlines and destinations

El Obeid Air Base

The airport hosts Sudanese Air Force Helicopter Squadron operating Mil Mi-24 and Mil Mi-35 attack helicopters.

References

External links
 

Airports in Sudan
North Kurdufan
El-Obeid